St. Matthew's High School is a government high school in Keiskammahoek, Eastern Cape, South Africa. It has boarding facility for girls, day-boys do attend the school.

History

John Armstrong, the first bishop of Grahamstown on his enthronement in 1854 committed himself and his church to respond to the needs of the Xhosa people suffering the impact of the wars of dispossession. This resulted in the establishment St Matthews Mission at Keiskammahoek (among others).

Chief Socishe donated  of land for the St Matthews Mission and Sir George Grey, the colonial governor, approved the development. The school began to operate in 1856.

The institutional link between St Matthews and St. Andrew's College, Grahamstown began in the 1860s when students were sent from mission schools to what was known as the Kaffir Institute that was part of St Andrews College, run by the Revd William Greenstock. Greenstock (who married Frances Ellen Cotterill, the daughter of Henry Cotterill, the second bishop of Grahamstown) later moved to St Matthew's Mission and where he became a skilled linguist and writer of hymns in the Xhosa language.

The Revd H.B. Smith, the first resident missionary to St Matthews, worked closely with the military chaplain, the Revd George Dacre, to lay the foundations of the earliest buildings and build the water furrows that still supply water to the school.

In the 1860s The Revd Charles Taberer moved to the school and began offering academic classes in the morning and engaging the pupils in industrial work in the afternoons. He oversaw the laying of the foundation stone of the church and opened a hostel for girls.

Restoration
The Church of the Province of Southern Africa, (now named the Anglican church of Southern Africa) decided in 1957 after a painful decision making process to withdraw from education where the 1953 Bantu Education Act was applicable. Like many other mission schools, St Matthews was taken over by the state as a result of the Bantu Education Act. The St. Matthew's Mission continued, but without Anglican involvement in the school.

A project to restore the mission schools came about after then Arts and Culture Minister, Pallo Jordan and the then Anglican Archbishop Njongonkulu Ndungane held a brainstorming session in August 2007 in which they discussed restoring historical schools; mission schools in particular.

Notable alumni and alumnae
Nosiviwe Mapisa-Nqakula, a former Minister of Home Affairs
James Calata

See also
Shades, the novel by Marguerite Poland
Nancy Charton

Notes and references

External links

Boarding schools in South Africa
Anglican schools in South Africa
Schools in the Eastern Cape
Amathole District Municipality